Beulah Presbyterian Church is a historic church at Beulah and McCready Roads in Churchill, Pennsylvania. The hilltop location of the church gave the borough of Churchill its name.

The original church building was constructed around 1837 and added to the National Register of Historic Places in 1975. A newer church building is located on the same grounds.

See also

National Register of Historic Places listings in Allegheny County, Pennsylvania

References

External links

Churches on the National Register of Historic Places in Pennsylvania
Georgian architecture in Pennsylvania
Churches completed in 1837
19th-century Presbyterian church buildings in the United States
Churches in Allegheny County, Pennsylvania
Pittsburgh History & Landmarks Foundation Historic Landmarks
Historic American Buildings Survey in Pennsylvania
National Register of Historic Places in Pittsburgh